Prince Carl (Karl) of Solms-Braunfels (27 July 1812 – 13 November 1875) was a German prince and military officer in both the Austrian army and the cavalry of the Grand Duchy of Hesse. As commissioner general of the Adelsverein, he spearheaded the establishment of colonies of German immigrants in Texas. Prince Solms named New Braunfels, Texas, in honor of his homeland.

Early years and family life

Prince Friedrich Wilhelm Karl Ludwig Georg Alfred Alexander of Solms-Braunfels was born in Neustrelitz. His father was Prince Friedrick Wilhelm of Solms-Braunfels, second husband of Princess Frederica of Mecklenburg-Strelitz, who bore 13 children during the course of her three marriages.

Although he was the landless, younger son of a younger son of a minor German prince, whose realm had been mediatized in 1806, Friedrich's 1834 marriage to Luise Auguste Stephanie Beyrich was considered below his princely station and had to be conducted morganatically. They had three children:
 Marie (born 1835, married Wilhelm Bähr)
 Karl Louis (1837–1918, married Wilhelmine Gantenhammer)
 Melanie (born 1840, married Karl Heil)

In 1837, his mother became queen consort of Hanover.  Shortly before her death in 1841, his stepfather, King Ernest Augustus, a member of the British royal family, succeeded in pressuring Friedrich to make a monetary arrangement with his wife and three children for a de facto royal annulment. Luise and her children were ennobled in the Grand Duchy of Hesse under the name von Schönau on 25 March 1841. The family was further ennobled in 1912 with the surname von Schönau de Solms.

Prince Carl married Maria Josephine Sophie, widow of Prince Franz of Salm-Salm and a princess of Löwenstein-Wertheim-Rosenberg by birth, on 3 December 1845. The union produced five children:
 Prince Ludwig (1847–1900)
 Princess Eulalia (1851–1922), married Edouard, son of Eugène, 8th Prince of Ligne
 Princess Marie (1852–1882)
 Princess Sophie (1853–1869)
 Prince Alexander (1855–1926)

Carl was well-educated, well-connected, and handsome.  An adventure seeker, he became a captain in the cavalry in the Imperial Army of Austria in 1841.

Texas

During his service with the cavalry, Carl read books about Texas and became interested in joining the Adelsverein. Appointed its commissioner general in 1844, he was the motivating force for the first colony of German emigrants to Texas. He arrived on Texas soil in July 1844, making an exploratory tour as advisor to the Adelsverein, which owned the rights to the Fisher–Miller Land Grant. Subsequently, Carl purchased an additional  on the Guadalupe River on behalf of the Adelsverein, where he established the colony of New Braunfels, Texas. His vision cleared the path for John O. Meusebach to follow in 1845 as the organizer, negotiator, and political force needed for community-building structure in the "New Germany".

In anticipation of his marriage to Maria Josephine Sophie, Prince Solms formed plans to build "Sophie's Castle", laying the cornerstone in New Braunfels in 1845. Sophie refused to leave Germany, and Carl never returned to Texas after his 3 December 1845 marriage to her.

Return to Germany and later years

After returning to Germany, he left the Austrian army and became a colonel in the cavalry of the Grand Duchy of Hesse  in 1846. He was able to rejoin the Austrian army in 1850, becoming a brigadier in 1859 with command of dragoons on Lake Constance. He took part in the 1866 Austro-Prussian War. He retired as a Feldmarschallleutnant (lieutenant general) in 1868 to his residence at the estate of Rheingrafenstein near Kreuznach on the Nahe River. Prince Solms died on 13 November 1875 and is interred in the city cemetery of Bad Kreuznach.

Timeline

Ancestry

References

External links
The Sophienburg
New Braunfels Chamber of Commerce
Official New Braunfels, Texas, web site

1812 births
1875 deaths
People from Neustrelitz
People from Mecklenburg-Strelitz
German princes
Prussian nobility
German city founders
Austrian politicians
German-American history
German-American culture in Texas
House of Solms-Braunfels
American city founders